The Rockwell AIM-65 computer is a development computer introduced in 1978 based on the MOS Technology 6502 microprocessor. The AIM-65 is essentially an expanded KIM-1 computer. Available software included a line-oriented machine code monitor, BASIC interpreter, assembler, Pascal, PL/65, and FORTH development system. Available hardware included a floppy disk controller and a backplane for expansion.

Features 
Rockwell advertised the $375 AIM-65, with 1K RAM, as an "easy, inexpensive [computer] ... for learning, designing, work or just fun". Standard software included the system console monitor software in ROM, called Advanced Interactive Monitor. It featured an assembler, disassembler, setting and viewing memory and registers, starting execution of other programs and more. Single stepping was made possible using non-maskable interrupt (NMI). The command prompt was the less-than sign "<", and on receiving a single character command, it added this input character and the greater-than sign ">". If the thermal printer was turned on, this would be output on a single line. The monitor included a number of service routines that could be accessed and used by a user's program to control I/O and code execution, and was fully documented, including source code.

The machine featured dual cassette tape control. This made it possible to write large assembly programs using the two-pass assembler ROM. Source code in text was written twice consecutively to the input tape, and then the assembler, which could start/stop the input cassette tape using motor control was invoked. During the first pass the symbol table was built and stored in RAM. During the second pass symbols would be translated and code written out to the second tape, also using start/stop motor control. Being able to avoid storing code in RAM made it possible to save much space. It was however, still important to keep the symbols list short since RAM size was often no more than 4 KB.

In 1981, Rockwell introduced an improved model with a 40 character display as the AIM-65/40.  An industrial chassis version was known as the System 65 and included a PROM burner and floppy drives. Rockwell was also a pioneer in solid-state storage devices, introducing "bubble memory" non-volatile expansion boards about 1980.

Micro Technology Unlimited (MTU) made a "Visible Memory" card in 1978 that worked with the KIM-1 and AIM-65 computers, providing raster graphics display capability. MTU also made the first real time music synthesizer for a microcomputer; it worked with the KIM-1 and AIM-65, and featured a DAC with software providing 4 voices of wavetable-lookup synthesis.

In Spain they were distributed by Comelta. This company made various card expansions:
CR-106  8 Kbytes of RAM
CR-119  RAM / ROM / PROM expansion
CR-120  Universal programming
CR-115  Microcassette controller(two units)
CR-113  Video controller
CR-401  Board Bus Extension(Standard S-64)

Comelta assembled all the options in a single box to produce a new computer, the Comelta Drac-1. The first prototype used microcassetes, but definitive versions have two 8" floppy disk drives.

In the late 1970s, the Rockwell AIM-65, and successor System 65 became the first computers used on board a float in the Tournament of Roses Parade. Cal Poly Universities wrote their own animation control language to control hydraulic and motor actuators on floats for many years. In 2003, some of these 27-year-old computers were still in use controlling various displays and creatures at a high tech Halloween show near Alexandria, Virginia, U.S.A.

Technical specifications
 Built-in full-sized QWERTY keyboard
 20 character alphanumeric LED display (16 segments)
 Integrated 20 character thermal printer
 20 mA current-loop serial interface (can be adapted to RS-232)
 Expansion connector
 Application connector with 6522 VIA chip
 4 KB RAM
 5 sockets for 4 KB ROM/EPROM chips

Reception
Compute! stated that the monitor was by itself almost worth the price of the AIM-65. It concluded that the computer was "an excellent value at the $375 needed for minimum configurations".

Programming 
PL/65 was a programming language designed and implemented by Rockwell International for the AIM-65.
It is based on a mix of ALGOL and PL/I, simplified where possible in order to adapt to the limited processing environment afforded by the 6502  (64k memory for instance).

Emulation
AIM-65 can be emulated using MESS Emulator. But that emulation lacks printer support. Also Sysinfo.dat file states that "Would suffer from support for intelligent terminals as tty equipment."

See also
 Microprocessor development board
 Elektor Junior Computer
 SYM-1

References

External links
 Rockwell AIM-65 computer at oldcomputers.net
 AIM-65 at Old Computer Museum
 AIM-65 at Obsolete Computer Museum
 DRAC-1 at Old Computers ES Museum

Early microcomputers